Kishanganj district of Bihar, India comprises only one sub-division, Kishanganj, which is divided into 7 Blocks and has a total of 771 villages. There are 39 uninhabited villages (out of 771 total villages) in the district of Kishanganj.

This is list of villages of  Kishanganj district according to respective blocks.

Bhahadurganj 

  Altabari
 Babhantola Laucha
 Baisa
 Baisa Jurail
 Baisagopalganj
 Bangaon
 Bangaon Milik
 Baradenga
 Basbari
 Belbari
 Betbari
 Bhadesar
 Bhatabari
 Bhaurdah
 Bhupla
 Birnia
 Birpur
 Bishunpur
 Bochagari
 Brahmotar Gachh
 Chanaur
 Chanaur Milik
 Chandargaon
 Charakpara Laucha
 Chhota Laucha
 Chikabari
 Chorkattakurhaila
 Dabar
 Dahgaon
 Dahgaon
 Dala
 Dala Mohiuddinpur
 Damdama
 Deotar Birnia
 Deshiatoli
 Dharhar
 Dogacchi
 Dohar
 Domohani
 Duadangi
 Dulali
 Dulali
 Dulali Milik
 Durgapur
 Durgapur Bangaon
 Durgapur Sohadi
 Gangi
 Goabari
 Gopalpur Bairgachhi
 Guabari
 Gurgaon
 Gurgaon Milik
 Haribhasa
 Haribhasa
 Jhiljhili
 Jhiljhili
 Jhingakata
 Jhingakata Istamrar
 Jhingakata Taufir
 Kasbe Anganj Urf KasbaKhodaganj
 Kathalbari
 Kathalbari
 Kharij Kumhia
 Kharsel
 Koimari
 Koimari
 Korat Bangaon
 Kumhartoli
 Kurhaila
 Lahsora
 Laucha
 Lohia Kandar
 Lohia Kandar
 Mahadeo Dighi
 Mahammad Nagar
 Mahesh Bathna
 Mohan Singh Gachh
 Muktaram Deori
 Murmala
 Musaldenga
 Netuapara
 Netuapara
 Nisndara
 Pahatgaon
 Palasmani
 Phulbari
 Pipra Gachh
 Rampur
 Rangamani
 Ruidhasa
 Rupni
 Sakaur
 Samesar
 Satmeri
 Sikmi Bangaon
 Siktihar
 Siktiharuttarbasti
 Singhia
 Sukhani
 Tangtangia
 Tangtangia
 Tangtangia
 Tegharia
 Tharkachhpur
 Tulshia

Dighalbank 

 Algachhia
 Aliganj
 Baijnath Palsa
 Bansbari
 Banwaria
 Barbhang
 Bhurli Bhita
 Boaldaha
 Chhota Garumara
 Dahibhat
 Dahibhat Kalan
 Dahibhat Khurd
 Dargah Aliganj
 Dargah Rasulganj
 Dargah kanchanbari
 Deogirja
 Dhanola
 Dighal Bank
 Dighal Bank
 Dighibari
 Doria
 Dubri
 Dubri khas
 Garbhanadenga
 Garumara
 Ghangra
 Gurhmurha
 Harhibhita
 Hari Bhita
 Haruadanga
 Hublidenga
 Ichmari
 Ikra
 Ikra Milik
 Ikra Milik
 Ikra Milik
 Jiapokhar
 Kachunala
 Kachunala Milik
 Kachunala Milik
 Kachunala Milik
 Kalpir Pathar Ghatti
 Kamat
 Kamati
 Kanchan Bari
 Karuamani
 Kast Karam Ali
 Kumarkhod
 Kumhia
 Kurhaili
 Lachhmipur
 Lohagarha
 Lohargarha
 Mahamari
 Maldangi
 Malmali
 Maltoli
 Maltoli
 Mangra
 Mulabari
 Mustalaganj
 Padampur
 Padampur
 Pakamari
 Palsa
 Palsa Milik
 Panchgachhi
 Patharghatti
 Patharghatti
 Sat Kauwa
 Satmeri
 Singhimari
 Singhimari Milik
 Suribhita
 Talwar Bandha
 Tanghan Tapu
 Tapu
 Tarabari
 Teli Bhita
 Tulshia
 Tulshia Kasht

Kishanganj 

 Andhuakol
 Andowakol
 Babhantola
 Bairgachhi
 Balia
 Bararo
 Barchuna
 Basantpur
 Basatpur Marua Toli
 Basatpur Milik
 Basatpur Pharsadangi
 Bastadangi
 Belwa
 Belwa Kasipur
 Belwa Milik
 Bheriadangi
 Chakla
 Chaundi
 Chhagalia
 Chhagalia
 Chhota Salki
 Chormara
 Daula
 Dheksara
 Gachhpara
 Gachhpara
 Goaltoli
 Gobindpur
 Halamala
 Janamjai
 Jharbari
 Jia Gachhi
 Kaparporbandha
 Kasipur
 Katahalia
 Katahalia Bhag
 Katmohan
 Kirdah Samda
 Kolaha
 Lakhimara
 Lalbari
 Mahammadpur Bhagal
 Mahesh Bathna
 Mahesh Bathna Khas
 Mahesh Bathnakhas Milik
 Majhok
 Meda
 Mehangaon
 Mehengaon Milik
 Motihara
 Motihara Taluka
 Nonia
 Panisal
 Phulwari
 Phulwari
 Phulwari
 Piakunri
 Pichhla
 Pirani
 Purla bari
 Satkhamhar
 Simalbari
 Singhia
 Singhia
 Solki
 Sultanpur
 Taisa
 Telia Pokhar
 Tengramari
 Thauapara
 Thaunapara
 Topamari

Kochadhaman 

 Altabari
 Anarkali
 Andhasur
 Arugaon
 Asura
 Babhangaon
 Bagalbari
 Bahkol
 Baichakutti
 Balia
 Balubari
 Barahmasia
 Barbata
 Barijan Durgapur
 Barijan Pothimari Jagir
 Bastakolaha
 Bastakolha
 Bhag Baisa
 Bhagal
 Bhagpunash
 Bhaunra
 Bhawaniganj
 Bhebhal
 Bhebhra
 Birwachurakutti
 Birwakalkali
 Bishunpur
 Bishunpur
 Boaldah
 Bohita
 Burhimari
 Chapra Bakhari
 Charaia
 Chunamari
 Churakutti
 Dahuabari
 Dalia
 Danti
 Daua
 Deramari
 Dhanpura
 Dhanpurakhari
 Dhanusna
 Dhanusna
 Dogharia
 Dongidighi
 Dopokharia
 Doria
 Dubra
 Durgapur
 Gangikhurd
 Gauramani
 Ghurna
 Gurgaon
 Haldikhora
 Haribhasa
 Harkhuguria
 Harwadanga
 Hasan Dumaria
 Hatgachhi
 Hatgachhi
 Himatnagar
 Jadhail
 Jhantipari Anarkali
 Jhura
 Jiwanpur
 Kabaia
 Kairbirpur
 Kajlamari
 Kalanagin
 Kalkali
 Kamalpur
 Kanhaiabari
 Karehbari
 Kashibari
 Katamata
 Kathalbari
 Kochadhaman
 Koitor
 Kolaha
 Konhaiabari
 Kuari
 Kushpara
 Kutti
 Lator
 Lodhna
 Lodhnakhargi
 Mahadha
 Mahiarpur
 Mahua
 Majgaon
 Majkuri
 Makraha
 Makraha
 Masidgarh Dargah
 Masidgarh Milik
 Masidgarh Mohiuddinpur
 Masidgarh Pokharkona
 Mastalia
 Mehadipur
 Moharmari
 Moharmari Khurd
 Molingaon
 Mosangaon
 Mujabari
 Nagri
 Najarpur
 Naranga
 Natuapara
 Nihalbhag
 Pachahara
 Parhalpur
 Parhalpur Milik
 Parwa
 Patkoi khurd
 Patkoikalan
 Phulbari
 Pipla
 Pipra
 Pokharia
 Potkoi Milik
 Purandaha
 Rangamani
 Rani
 Rasulganj
 Rohania
 Rohia
 Rohonia Milik
 Santha
 Saptia
 Sarai
 Satbhitha
 Sehangaon
 Shahnagar
 Shahpur
 Shahpur Istamrar
 Singhari
 Singhia Chakandara
 Singhiakhari
 Sirar
 Sukalrani
 Sundarbari
 Sundarpuchhi
 Surang
 Tegharia
 Thutipakar
 Titiha
 Titlia
 Topamari
 Topamari

Pothia 

 Adhikari
 Andabari
 Arrabari
 Bagalbari
 Bagalbari Milik
 Bagalbari Milik Arazi
 Bagrani
 Bakhonala
 Baksa
 Banasi
 Barab Kahunia
 Barapokhar
 Bhatkhunda
 Bhatkhunda
 Bhelagachhi
 Bhota Thana
 Birpur
 Birpur
 Bisani
 Bolasan
 Budhra
 Burhnai
 CHilhamari
 Charkhakati
 Chechuabari
 Chhagalia
 Chhamtia
 Chhatar Gachh
 Chiagaon
 Chitma
 Chitma
 Choragaddi
 Damal Bari
 Damarbari
 Darigaon
 Debiganj
 Dhangi Pokhar
 Dhantola
 Dhekipara
 Dhobinia
 Dongra
 Dubanochi
 Dubanochi
 Galgalia
 Gangnati
 Gangnati Arazigachh
 Gelabari
 Gendaloti
 Geramari
 Goabari
 Gobinda
 Gorukhal
 Halda
 Haldagaon
 Haldibari
 Indarpur
 Indarpur Khurd
 Jagir Gachh
 Jahangirpur
 Jalalpur
 Jangiabari
 Jhokha Dangi
 Jogi Gachh
 Jogihara
 Kala Singhia
 Kalakachu
 Kalidas
 Kalidas Arazi kismat
 Kalidas Kismat
 Kalupathaurf Koimari
 Karigaon Milik
 Kasba Kaliaganj
 Keso Jara
 Kharkhari
 Khatia Pichhla
 Koltha
 Kuimari
 Kulthibari
 Kusiari
 Lodhabari
 Lohagara
 Lukundra
 Mahogarh
 Mahsul
 Makhan Pokhar
 Mamubhagina
  Mangur Jan
 Mangur Jon
 Maria
 Miramani
 Mirzapur
 Mohania
 Molnapara
 Musaldenga
 Nandakuri
 Naribasar
 Naukatta
 Naunaddi
 Naunaddi
 Nimalagaon
 Nimalagaon Milik
 Paharkatta
 Pakamolna
 Pakamolna
 Pakamolna
 Pamal
 Panasi
 Panasi
 Panbara
 Panighatta
 Parla Bari
 Parlabari Milik
 Patilabhasa
 Pawakhali
 Phala
 Pharabari
 Phati Pokhar
 Phulhara Milik
 Phulhera
 Phulhera Gachh
 Piakori
 Pokharia
 Pothia
 Purandarpur
 Raipur
 Ramaniapokhar
 Rasiadangi
 Ratanpur
 Ratua
 Sahagi
 Saithabari
 Saradighi
 Sarogora
 Satbaulia
 Satbaulia Khurd
 Shekhpura
 Singhari Gobindpur
 Singhiamari
 Sita Jhari
 Sita Jhari
 Sital Gachh
 Sitalpur
 Sonapur
 Taiabpur
 Taria
 Tarni
 Theikalbari
 Thipi Jhari
 Udgara

Terhagachh 

 Asha
 Babhangawan
 Baigna
 Bairia
 Balua Jagir
 Baluadandgi
 Bansbari
 Belbarigachh
 Benugarh
 Betbari
 Bhag Kajleta
 Bhagjhunki
 Bhardhari
 Bhelagurhi
 Bhelagurhi
 Bhorha
 Chargharia
 Chichora
 Chilhania
 Dahibhat
 Dak Pokhar
 Deorikhas
 Dhabaili
 Dhokarjhari
 Doria
 Gamharia
 Gargaon
 Ghani Phulsara
 Gilni
 Hatgaon
 Hatgaon
 Hawakol
 Hawakol Khurd
 Jhala
 Jhunki Musahara
 Kadleta
 Kalpir
 Kamat Hatgaon
 Kamdti Nankar
 Kanchanbari
 Kanchanbari Istamrar
 Khajuribari
 Khaniabad
 Khara Suhia
 Kharij Khaniabad
 Kharra
 Kharra Belbari
 Kharrakasht
 Khunia Toli
 Kuari
 Lodhabari
 Mahua
 Mahua Gachh
 Matiari
 Mianpur
 Mianpur
 Nania
 Panchgachhi
 Pharhabari
 Pharhabari Milik
 Pharhabari Nankar
 Phulbari
 Phulbari
 Phulbari
 Phulbari
 Phulbari Nankar
 Pipra
 Pipra
 Pokharia
 Pokharia
 Rahmatpur
 Rampur
 Serati Kamati
 Sharma Toli
 Sharma Toli
 Sirnia
 Sirnia
 Suhia
 Suhia Gopalnagar
 Tegharia
 Tokabhansa

Thakurgunj 

 Akhra
 Ambari
 Amol Jhari
 Babhangaon
 Babhangaon
 Bahadurpur
 Balka Dobha
 Bandar Jhula
 Bandar Jhula
 Bandar Jhula
 Bandar Jhula
 Bandar Jhula
 Bansbari
 Barah Pathia
 Barah Pathia
 Barah Pathia
 Barchaundi
 Barchaundi
 Besarbati
 Bhagkharna
 Bhata Thana
 Bhatgaon
 Bhaulmari
 Bhaulmari
 Bhaulmari
 Bhaulmari
 Bhelagori
 Bhendrani
 Bhendrani
 Bhog Dabar
 Bhota Thana
 Bidhibhita
 Burhnai Bahadurpur
 Chak Chaki
 Chapati
 Chapra Bakhari
 Chhaital
 Chhatar Katharo
 Churli
 Churli
 Dakpara
 Dalligaon
 Dalligaon
 Dastur
 Deramari
 Dhak Para
 Dhakpara
 Dhakpara
 Dogachhi
 Dudhaunti
 Dudhmanjar
 Dudhmanjar
 Dumaria
 Fatehjangpur
 Gamhirgarh
 Giddhnikola
 Gilhabari
 Gothra
 Gual Toli
 Gunjar Mari
 Harin Dubal
 Hasanpur
 Hazarigachh
 Hulhuli
 Hulhuli Milik Arazi
 Hulhuli Milik Arazi
 Hulhuli Milik Arazi
 Hulhuli Milik Arazi
 Hulhuli Milik Arazi
 Hulhuli Milik Arazi
 Jiapokhar
 Jiapokhar
 Jio Pokhar
 Jirangachh
 Kachhudah
 Kanakpur
 Karua Mani
 Karua Mani
 Karua Mari
 Katharo
 Katharo
 Khanabari
 Kharna
 Kharna
 Kharudah
 Kharudah
 Khaurdah
 Khudra
 Koia
 Kudiachhara
 Kudurbaghi
 Kukur Baghi Milik
 Kukurbaghi
 Kunjimari
 Kuri Muni
 Lahugaon Arazi
 Landhandara
 Landhandara
 Latkukur Baghi
 Malingaon
 Maujidinga
 Modati
 Nazagachh
 Nazarpur
 Nikarbari
 Noniatari
 Pabna
 Paikpara
 Paikpara
 Panchgachhi
 Patbhari
 Patbhari
 Patesari
 Patharia
 Pawa Khali
 Pawa Khali
 Petbhari
 Phatamari
 Rajagaon
 Rajagaon
 Rajagaon Milik
 Rasia
 Ruidhasa
 Sabodangi
 Sakhuadali
 Salgori
 Saraikuri
 Satbaulia
 Singhimari
 Sukhani
 Tatpowa
 Teghari
 Udragori

References 

Kishanganj district

Kishanganj district